Pu Chaozhu (1929–2002) was a People's Republic of China politician. He was born in Huaning of the Yunnan Province. He was the Chinese Communist Party Committee Secretary (1985–1995) and Governor (1983–1985) of Yunnan.

References

1929 births
2002 deaths
People's Republic of China politicians from Yunnan
Chinese Communist Party politicians from Yunnan
Members of the 12th Central Committee of the Chinese Communist Party